The Piano Concerto No. 2 in E major, Op. 59 is an 1898 composition by Moritz Moszkowski. It was dedicated to pianist Josef Hofmann.

Instrumentation 
The work is scored for solo piano and an orchestra of 2 flutes, 2 oboes, 2 clarinets, 2 bassoons, 4 horns, 2 trumpets, 3 trombones, timpani, triangle, harp, and strings.

Structure 

 Moderato, E major, around 12'00"
 Andante, C-sharp minor, around 08'30"
Scherzo. Vivace, C-sharp minor -- D-flat major, around 06'30"
 Allegro deciso, E major, around 09'00"

First movement (Moderato) 
This brilliant composition opens with what may be taken as its principal theme, inasmuch as it furnishes most of the material for the development, and also reappears in the last movement as a climax to the whole work. The announcement of this resolute subject by flutes, oboes, clarinets and bassoons accompanied lightly by horns, violas, cellos and contrabasses is followed by a short solo cadenza, after which the unfolding of the musical picture begins. As this proceeds, several subsidiary melodies come to notice, prominent among them being one which—while hinted at before—does not assume its formal shape until given out, grazioso, by the pianoforte alone following a short upward chromatic scale passage. This graceful subject also figures conspicuously in the development which, after passing through a succession of interesting stages, culminates finally in a rousing climax.

Second movement (Andante) 
Marked Andante, the second movement is an eloquent, nocturne-like effusion, of which the principal thematic element is the expressive subject given out softly at the commencement by the clarinet, and bassoons, staccato, and the strings, pizzicato - this being taken up shortly and carried on by the solo instrument. An agreeably contrasting intermediary section follows, after which the expressive first theme returns - now in the harp and strings against flowing figurations in the solo instrument. And lastly, a free short conclusion passage that takes us to the third movement.

Third movement (Scherzo. Vivace) 
The Scherzo, marked Vivace, is a sparkling composition in Moszkowski's characteristically brilliant manner. This busy movement commences with the statement of a nimble running theme by the solo instrument.

Fourth movement (Allegro deciso) 
The finale opens with a short flourishing introductory passage which leads to the statement of a resolute theme by the solo instrument. After this has been developed at considerable length the pianoforte introduces a contrasting theme of flowing character, to which the clarinet attaches itself shortly. Presently the development of the resolute opening theme is resumed, leading to the entrance of still another subject, given out softy but decidedly by the clarinet and the violas, and worked up forthwith in alternation and combination with the resolute opening theme. The flowing second theme returns, the movement mounting thence to a climax, at the pinnacle of which the resolute opening theme of the first movement reappears in enlarged rhythm.

Recordings

See also
List of compositions by Moritz Moszkowski

External links 
 Piano Concerto No.2: Scores at the International Music Score Library Project
 Moszkowski Piano Concerto No.2 analysis and description: Naxos Direct
 Introduction of Moszkowski's Piano Concerto No.2 on Gramophone
 Moszkowski: Piano Concerto, review: 'sumptuous and glistening'
 Grieg & Moszkowski Piano Concertos played by Joseph Moog

Compositions by Moritz Moszkowski
1898 compositions
Moszkowski 2